Gautam Raghavan is an Indian American political advisor who is the director of the White House Presidential Personnel Office. Raghavan previously served as the associate director of the Office of Public Liaison in the Obama administration.

Early life and education 
Raghavan was born in India and raised in Seattle, Washington. He received his Bachelor of Arts degree from Stanford University in 2004 and attended the Graduate School of Political Management at George Washington University from 2004 until 2006.

Career 
Raghavan served as the associate director of the Office of Public Liaison under President Obama, acting as a liaison to both the LGBT and Asian American and Pacific Islander communities from 2011 to 2017. As the associate director Raghavan facilitated conversation on issues impacting both the LGBT and Asian American and Pacific Islander communities, including marriage equality, workplace nondiscrimination, transgender rights, bullying prevention, immigration reform, hate violence, and access to health care. It was during Raghavan's tenure that President Obama spoke out in favor of marriage equality, and later signed an executive order barring federal contractors from discriminating on the basis of sexual orientation and gender identity.

He has also worked for the Progressive Majority, the 2008 Obama campaign, the Democratic National Committee, the Gill Foundation, and the U.S. Department of Defense as the outreach lead for its "Don’t Ask, Don’t Tell" Working Group. 

Outside of government, Raghavan has worked as a consultant for progressive organizations including the Biden Foundation and IMPACT, the Indian American Impact Project & Fund, the latter being an initiative that supports Indian Americans in politics. He was also founding executive director of IMPACT, 2016–18. Raghavan was the editor of West Wingers: Stories from the Dream Chasers, Change Makers, and Hope Creators Inside the Obama White House, which includes personal accounts by eighteen Obama Administration staffers.

From December 2018 to July 2020, Raghavan was the chief of staff for Congresswoman Pramila Jayapal. In June 2020, Biden selected Raghavan to serve on his presidential transition team.

Personal life 
Raghavan is openly gay. He lives with his husband Andy, and their daughter in Washington D.C.

References 

Living people
American politicians of Indian descent
Biden administration personnel
Gay politicians
Indian emigrants to the United States
American LGBT people of Asian descent
Indian LGBT politicians
American LGBT rights activists
LGBT appointed officials in the United States
Obama administration personnel
Stanford University alumni
Year of birth missing (living people)